Bairu Raghuram (born 1949) is an Indian painter.  His depictions are simple, rural life and woman in their daily life. He is mostly inspired by the tranquillity of rural Telangana.

Early life
Bairu Raghuram was born in Hyderabad, India.

He did his Bachelor of Arts from Osmania University and then continued to finish his Diploma in Drawing and Painting from I.F.A.I. Gulbarga, Karnataka.

Career
Bairu Raghuram worked as a freelancer for weekly and monthly magazines.

He travels to districts like Karimnagar, Warangal and Nizamabad to paint.

Awards
 Bharat Kala Parishad (1981 & 1985)
 Gold medal from Hyderabad Art Society (1983,1987 & 1996)
 National Academi Award (1997)

References

External links
 Profile and Paintings

Indian male painters
Living people
Telugu people
Artists from Hyderabad, India
1949 births
20th-century Indian painters
Painters from Andhra Pradesh
Osmania University alumni
20th-century Indian male artists